Man of Courage is a 1943 American crime film directed by Alexis Thurn-Taxis and written by Arthur St. Claire, Barton MacLane and John Vlahos. The film stars Barton MacLane, Charlotte Wynters, Lyle Talbot, Dorothy Burgess, Patsy Nash and Forrest Taylor. The film was released on January 4, 1943, by Producers Releasing Corporation.

Plot

Cast      
Barton MacLane as John Wallace
Charlotte Wynters as Joyce Griffith
Lyle Talbot as George Dickson
Dorothy Burgess as Sally Dickson
Patsy Nash as Mary Ann
Forrest Taylor as Mark Crandall
John Ince as Tom Haines
Jane Novak as Mrs. Black
Erskine Johnson as himself
Claire Grey as Alice
Steve Clark as Judge Roberts
Billy Gray as Mike Wilson
Frank Yaconelli as Pete

References

External links
 

1943 films
American crime films
1943 crime films
Producers Releasing Corporation films
American black-and-white films
1940s English-language films
1940s American films